The 1937–38 season was Manchester United's 42nd season in the Football League.

The season began with Scott Duncan still manager after the club's relegation, but he was sacked on 7 November 1937 and two days later Walter Crickmer was appointed as the manager for the second time.

At the end of the season, United finished second in the league and were promoted back to the First Division, where they would remain for the next 36 years.

Second Division

FA Cup

References

Manchester United F.C. seasons
Manchester United